Leslie Anthony Joseph Thompson (17 October 1901, Kingston, Jamaica – 26 December 1987, London) was a Jamaican jazz trumpeter and trombonist who moved to England in 1929.

Biography
Thompson was born in Kingston, Jamaica, where he studied music as a child at the Roman Catholic Alpha Cottage School. When he was 16, he joined the West India Regiment and played in their band locally in Kingston movie palaces in the 1920s, before moving to London in 1929 and studying at Kneller Hall. He had been unable to become a bandmaster in the army because of rules preventing black soldiers becoming officers. He also played euphonium and cornet.

In 1930 he began playing with Spike Hughes, where he played trumpet, trombone, and double bass until 1932. In 1934–35 Thompson toured Europe with Louis Armstrong, then formed his own band, intended to be all-black (although initially with two white trombonists who blacked up), with the help of Ken "Snakehips" Johnson, who himself took over control of this band in 1936. Jiver Hutchinson was one of his sidemen.

In 1936–37 Thompson played with Benny Carter, and later in the 1930s played double bass with Edmundo Ros. Thompson served in the Royal Artillery on the south coast during World War II and was active in dance halls and nightclubs after the war, but stopped playing music professionally after 1954 and later became a parole officer.

He was inspired by Marcus Garvey and an Anglican. Thompson's autobiography (edited by Jeffrey Green) was first published by Rabbit Press in 1985, and was reissued as Swing from a Small Island - The Story of Leslie Thompson by Northway Publications in 2009, when Chris Searle commented in the Morning Star: "Thompson’s story is one to read, one to learn from and one to remember".

References

Further reading
Jeffrey P. Green, "Leslie Thompson". Grove Jazz online.
Leslie Thompson with Jeffrey Green, Swing from a Small Island - The Story of Leslie Thompson. London: Northway Publications, 2009. 

1901 births
1987 deaths
20th-century trumpeters
Black British musicians
British Army personnel of World War II
Jamaican jazz trumpeters
Jamaican military musicians
Royal Artillery personnel
Jamaican military personnel
20th-century British musicians